The 2015–16 LEN Champions League was the 53rd edition of LEN's premier competition for men's water polo clubs. It ran from 4 September 2015 to 4 June 2016, and was contested by 27 teams from 13 countries. The Final Six (quarterfinals, semifinals, final, and third place game) took place on 2, 3 & 4 June in Budapest.

Overview

Team allocation

8 teams are directly qualified for the preliminary round.

Round and draw dates
The schedule of the competition is as follows.

Qualifying rounds

Qualification I
4-6 September 
Twelve teams took part in the Qualification round I. They were drawn into three groups of four teams, whose played on 4–6 September 2015. Top 3 teams of each group advance to qualification round II.

Group A
Tournament was played in Herceg Novi, Montenegro.

Group B
Tournament was played in Valletta, Malta.

Group C
Tournament was played in Tbilisi, Georgia.

Qualification II
 18–20 September
Sixteen teams took part in the Qualification round II. Nine teams from first round and seven teams with wild cards. These clubs formed four groups of four and had round robin tournaments at four host cities on 18–20 October. Top 2 of these groups advance to play-off (qualification round 3).

Group D
Tournament was played in Athens, Greece.

Group E
Tournament was played in Hannover, Germany.

Group F
Tournament was played in Rijeka, Croatia.

Group G
Tournament was played in Busto Arsizio, Italy.

Qualification III
3 October 2015: 1st match
17 October 2015: 2nd match

Eight teams took part in the Qualification round III. These teams played against each other over two legs on a home-and-away basis. The mechanism of the draws for each round was as follow:
In the draw for the Qualification round III, the four group winners were seeded, and the four group runners-up were unseeded. The seeded teams were drawn against the unseeded teams, with the seeded teams hosting the second leg. Teams from the same group could not be drawn against each other.
The first legs were played on 3 October, and the second legs were played on 17 October 2015.

Preliminary round

Main article: 2015–16 LEN Champions League preliminary round

The regular season was played between 28 October 2015 and 18 May 2016.
If teams are level on record at the end of the preliminary round, tiebreakers are applied in the following order:

 Head-to-head record.
 Head-to-head point differential.
 Point differential during the Regular Season.
 Points scored during the regular season.
 Sum of quotients of points scored and points allowed in each Regular Season match.

In each group, teams played against each other home-and-away in a round-robin format. The matchdays were 28 October, 11 November, 28 November, 16 December 2015, 3 February, 10 February, 30 March, 16 April, 30 April, and 18 May 2016. The top three teams advanced to the final six.

The Final Six (quarterfinals, semifinals, third place game and final) were played in Budapest, Hungary from 2 to 4 June 2016.

Group A

Group B

Final Six
Hajós Alfréd Nemzeti Sportuszoda, Budapest, Hungary

Final standings

Awards

See also
2015–16 LEN Euro Cup

References

External links
LEN Champions League (official website)

 
LEN Champions League seasons
Champions League
2015 in water polo
2016 in water polo